The Communist Party of Turkmenistan (in Turkmen: Türkmenistanyň Kommunistik Partiýasy (TKP)/Түркменистаның Коммунистик Партиясы (ТКП), in Russian: Коммунистическая партия Туркменистана) is a banned communist political party in Turkmenistan that was founded in 1998.

The original Communist Party of Turkmenistan was founded when Turkmenistan became a Republic in 1924. It was dissolved in December 1991 and reconstituted as the Democratic Party of Turkmenistan that has ruled the country since then.
In 1992 an Organizing Committee for the Restoration of the Communist Party was founded but the party was not legalized. In 1998 a constituent congress of the TKP was held and until 2002 it operated semi-legally. In that period Serdar Rahimow, a former ambassador to Pakistan became the leader of the KPT and the party became a member of the UCP-CPSU. In 2002 the regime claimed that a terrorist attack on the president Saparmurat Niyazov had taken place. Some sixty persons were arrested, among them Serdar Rahimow, and sentenced to long prison sentences. Since then the TKP went into deep underground.

References

Banned communist parties
Political parties established in 1998
Political parties in Turkmenistan
Turkmenistan
Communism in Turkmenistan
Turkmenistan
Neo-Sovietism